Senator Leslie may refer to:

James Graham Leslie (1868–1949), Northern Irish Senate
Preston Leslie (1819–1907), Kentucky State Senate
Sheila Leslie (born 1955), Nevada State Senate
Tim Leslie (born 1942), California State Senate

See also
John T. Lesley (1835–1913), Florida State Senate